Daytona International Speedway is a race track in Daytona Beach, Florida, United States. Since opening in 1959, it has been the home of the Daytona 500, the most prestigious race in NASCAR as well as its season opening event. In addition to NASCAR, the track also hosts races of ARCA, AMA Superbike, IMSA, SCCA, and Motocross. The track's  infield includes the  Lake Lloyd, which has hosted powerboat racing. The speedway is operated by NASCAR pursuant to a lease with the City of Daytona Beach on the property that runs until 2054. Dale Earnhardt is Daytona International Speedway's all-time winningest driver, with a total of 34 career victories (12 Daytona 500 Qualifying Races, 7 NASCAR Xfinity Series Races, 6 Busch Clash Races, 6 IROC Races, 2 Pepsi 400 July Races and the 1998 Daytona 500).

The track was built in 1959 by NASCAR founder William "Bill" France Sr. to host racing that was held at the former Daytona Beach Road Course. His banked design permitted higher speeds and gave fans a better view of the cars. Lights were installed around the track in 1998, and today it is the third-largest single-lit outdoor sports facility. The speedway has been renovated four times, with the infield renovated in 2004 and the track repaved in 1978 and 2010.

On January 22, 2013, the fourth speedway renovation was unveiled. On July 5, 2013, ground was broken on "Daytona Rising" to remove backstretch seating and completely redevelop the frontstretch seating. The renovation was by design-builder Barton Malow Company in partnership with Rossetti Architects. The project was completed in January 2016, and cost US $400 million. It emphasized improved fan experience with five expanded and redesigned fan entrances (called "injectors"), as well as wider and more comfortable seats, and more restrooms and concession stands. After the renovations were complete, the track's grandstands had 101,500 permanent seats with the ability to increase permanent seating to 125,000. The project was finished before the start of Speedweeks in 2016.

Track history

Construction
NASCAR founder William France Sr. began planning for the track in 1953 as a way to promote the series, which at the time was racing on the Daytona Beach Road Course. France met with Daytona Beach engineer Charles Moneypenny to discuss his plans for the speedway. He wanted the track to have the highest banking possible to allow the cars to reach high speeds and to give fans a better view of the cars on track. Moneypenny traveled to Detroit, Michigan to visit the Ford Proving Grounds which had a high-speed test track with banked corners. Ford shared their engineering design of the track with Moneypenny, providing the needed details of how to transition the pavement from a flat straightaway to a banked corner. France took the plans to the Daytona Beach city commission, who supported his idea and formed the Daytona Beach Speedway Authority.

The city commission agreed to lease the  parcel of land adjacent to Daytona Beach Municipal Airport to France's corporation for $10,000 a year over a 50-year period. France then began working on building funding for the project and found support from a Texas oil millionaire, Clint Murchison, Sr. Murchison lent France $600,000 along with the construction equipment necessary to build the track. France also secured funding from Pepsi-Cola, General Motors designer Harley Earl, a second mortgage on his home and selling 300,000 stock shares to local residents. Ground broke on construction of the  speedway on November 25, 1957.

To build the high banking, crews had to excavate over a million square yards of soil from the track's infield. Because of the high water table in the area, the excavated hole filled with water to form what is now known as Lake Lloyd, named after Joseph "Sax" Lloyd, one of the original six members of the Daytona Beach Speedway Authority. (The lake was stocked with 65,000 fish, and France arranged speedboat races on it.) 22 tons of lime mortar had to be brought in to form the track's binding base, over which asphalt was laid. Because of the extreme degree of banking, Moneypenny had to come up with a way to pave the incline. He connected the paving equipment to bulldozers anchored at the top of the banking. This allowed the paving equipment to pave the banking without slipping or rolling down the incline. Moneypenny subsequently patented his construction method and later designed Talladega Superspeedway and Michigan International Speedway. By December 1958, France had begun to run out of money and relied on race ticket sales to complete construction. He also received a substantial sum of money from the Pepsi company after attempting to obtain the money to finish construction from the Coca-Cola Company and being turned down.  For years from when the track opened to France's death, France never allowed Coca-Cola to be sold as a concession at any of the tracks he owned as a result.

The first practice run on the new track was on February 6, 1959. On February 22, 1959, 42,000 people attended the inaugural Daytona 500. Its finish was as startling as the track itself: Lee Petty beat Johnny Beauchamp in a photo finish that took three days to adjudicate. When the track opened it was the fastest race track to host a stock car race, until Talladega Superspeedway opened 10 years later. It was the occasion of Daytona's first fatality: George Amick, attempting to overtake for third late in the race, hit a wall and was killed.

Lights were installed around the track in 1998 to run NASCAR's July race, the Coke Zero 400 at night. The track was the world's largest single lighted outdoor sports facility until being surpassed by Losail International Circuit in 2008. Musco Lighting installed the lighting system, which took into account glare and visibility for aircraft arriving and departing nearby Daytona Beach International Airport, and costs about $240 per hour when in operation.

Layouts

Tri-oval

The tri-oval shape was revolutionary at the time as it greatly improved sight lines for fans. It is one of the two tracks on the NASCAR Cup Series circuit that uses restrictor plates to slow the cars down due to the high speeds, the other being Talladega Superspeedway.

On July 15, 2010, repaving of the track began. This came almost a year earlier than planned due to the track coming apart during the 2010 Daytona 500. The project used an estimated 50,000 tons of asphalt to repave  including the racing surface, apron, skid pads and pit road. Because of good weather, the project was completed ahead of schedule.

During NASCAR events, it takes less than a minute for the cars to complete a lap around the  tri-oval course.

Road courses

While the more famous 24 Hours of Le Mans is held near the summer solstice, Daytona's endurance race is held in winter (meaning more of the race is run at night). The track's lighting system is limited to 20% of its maximum output for the race to keep cars dependent on their headlights.

The  road course was built in 1959 and first hosted a three-hour sports car race called the Daytona Continental in 1962. The race length became  in 1964, and in 1966 was extended to a 24-hour endurance race known as the Rolex 24 at Daytona. It was shortened again to six hours in 1972 and the 1974 rendition of the race was cancelled entirely.

In 1973, a very sharp chicane was added at the end of the backstretch, approaching oval turn three.

In 1984 and 1985, the layout was modified, re-profiling road course turns 1 and 2, and moving what is now turn 3 (nicknamed the "International Horseshoe") closer to its preceding turns. Also, the chicane on the backstretch was modified. A new entry leg was constructed approximately  earlier, resulting in a longer, three-legged, "bus stop" shape. Cars would now enter in the first leg, bypass the second leg, and exit out of the existing third leg. Passing would now be possible inside the longer chicane.

In 2003, the backstretch chicane was modified once again. The middle leg was repaved and widened, and now cars would enter through the first leg, and exit out of the second leg. The existing third leg was abandoned. This allowed cars a cleaner entry into oval turn three. After favorable results, in 2010 the third leg was demolished and removed permanently.

In 2005, a second infield road course configuration was constructed, primarily for motorcycles. The Daytona SportBike that runs the Daytona 200 however, uses the main road course except for the motorcycle Pedro Rodríguez Hairpin (tighter than the one used for cars; the car version is used as an acceleration lane for motorcycles).

On September 26 and 27, 2006, the IndyCar Series held a compatibility test on the 10-turn,  modified road course, and the 12-turn  motorcycle road course with 5 drivers. The drivers who tested at the track were Vítor Meira, Sam Hornish Jr., Tony Kanaan, Scott Dixon and Dan Wheldon. This marked the first time since 1984 that open wheel cars have taken to the track at Daytona. On January 31 – February 1, 2007, IndyCar returned for a full test involving 17 cars.

On July 8, 2020, NASCAR announced that it would race the Daytona road course in all of its national series for the first time in mid-August (with the Cup Series racing the Go Bowling 235), due to current COVID-19 pandemic health restrictions in New York state (requiring 14 days self-isolation on arrival from other states) preventing the use of Watkins Glen International.

Supercross
During Daytona Beach Bike Week, a supercross track is built between the pit road and the tri-oval section of the track. Historically the track has used more sand than dirt, providing unique challenges to riders. The 2008–2013 track configurations were designed by former champion, Ricky Carmichael.

Daytona has hosted an AMA Supercross Championship round uninterruptedly since 1971.

Flat track and infield kart track
Popular dirt-track races in karting and flat-track motorcycle racing had been held at Daytona Beach Municipal Stadium but in 2009, the city announced the stadium was replacing its entire surface with FieldTurf, and thereby eliminating the flat-track racing at the stadium. To continue racing, speedway officials built the Daytona Flat Track, a new quarter-mile dirt track outside of turns 1 & 2 of the main superspeedway. It seats 5,000 in temporary grandstands and opened in December 2009 for WKA KartWeek.  From 2010 to 2016, it also hosted the AMA Grand National Championship, before it was moved in 2017 to the tri-oval section and became a TT course.

There is also a short paved kart/autocross track in the infield just inside of turn 3. The SCCA holds autocross on this track in addition to hosting sprint karting races during KartWeek.

Paved short track
In February 2012, it was announced that a  paved short track would be constructed along the backstretch of the Speedway's main course, for NASCAR's lower-tier series to compete at during Speedweeks called the UNOH Battle at the Beach, which is similar to the Toyota All-Star Showdown, formerly held at Irwindale Speedway. The first races were held on that track in February 2013. The track was shortened to a  oval in 2014 by shorter straightaways. The future of racing at the short track became uncertain after 2015 with the grandstands on the back straightaway being demolished as a part of the Daytona Rising project.

Football
In the fall of 1959, the track hosted several high school football games for the Father Lopez Green Wave in the first year of the school's football program.

The track hosted four college football games featuring the Daytona-based Bethune–Cookman Wildcats in 1974 and 1975. In early 2014 track president Joie Chitwood expressed a desire to bring football back to the track.

Soccer
On July 2 and 3, 2022, the track hosted Daytona Soccer Fest, a 2 day event highlighted by a friendly match between heated Colombian rivals América de Cali and Deportivo Cali and a NWSL regular season match between the Orlando Pride and Racing Louisville FC.

Video games
In 1994, Sega released an arcade game called Daytona USA, using their Model 2 Arcade hardware. It was developed by their famed "AM2" development team. It featured a fully detailed 3D model of the circuit for the very first time. The soundtrack for the game included vocals by Takenobu Mitsuyoshi. It is widely considered to be one of the most successful and influential racing games of all time. Daytona USA spawned many sequels, both in the arcades and on various home videogame consoles. The latest version, Daytona Championship USA, was released to arcades in 2017.

iRacing.com have laser-scanned the facility twice. The first in 2008, and 2011 once the repave was completed. Both are available in official racing series. There has been no word to when and if it will be re-scanned now that the Daytona Rising project has now been completed.

Both the oval layout and Rolex 24 Hour layout are available in both PlayStation 3 video games Gran Turismo 5 and Gran Turismo 6, and in the PlayStation 4 game Gran Turismo 7. Daytona International Speedway is also featured in Forza Motorsport 6 and Forza Motorsport 7 for the Xbox One and Windows 10.

Real Racing 3s second NASCAR update featured the Daytona International Speedway as a new circuit coming in three layouts. In addition to the oval and Rolex 24 Hour layouts in Gran Turismo, there also exists a Daytona 200 layout in the game.

Fatalities

A total of 40 people have been fatally injured in on-track incidents: 23 car drivers, twelve motorcyclists, three go-kart drivers, one powerboat racer, and one track worker. The most notorious death was that of Dale Earnhardt, who was killed on the last lap of the 2001 Daytona 500 on February 18, 2001.

Fan amenities

UNOH Fanzone
The UNOH Fanzone is an access package similar to pit passes for fans to get closer to drivers and race teams. The fanzone was built in 2004 as part of a renovation of the track's infield. Fans are able to walk on top of the garages, known as the "fandeck", and view track and garage activity. Fans can also view race teams working in the garage, including NASCAR technical inspection, through windows. The garage windows also include slots for fans to hand merchandise to drivers for autographs. The fanzone also includes a live entertainment stage, additional food and drink areas and various other activities and displays.

The 2004 renovation of the infield, headed by design firm HNTB, was the first major renovation of the infield in the history of the track. In addition to the fanzone, a new vehicle and pedestrian tunnel was built under turn 1.  The tunnel posed a challenge to engineers because it was to be built under the water table. Another challenge came during construction when three named hurricanes passed by the track, flooding much of the excavation work. The infield renovation involved landscaping and hardscaping, such as a new walkway along the shore of Lake Lloyd, and the construction of 34 new buildings, including garages and fueling stations, offices and inspection facilities, and a club. The renovation project received a 2005 Award for Excellence from Design-Build Institute of America. Following the success of the UNOH Fanzone at Daytona, Las Vegas Motor Speedway and Kansas Speedway each built a similar infield fanzone. On December 9, 2016, the speedway announced that the University of Northwestern Ohio purchased entitlement rights to the fanzone, and that the area will be named 'UNOH Fanzone'.

Budweiser Party Porch
The Budweiser Party Porch was a  porch located along the backstretch of the track. The porch featured tables, food and drinks, offering fans a "fun-filled" atmosphere that breaks fans away from the confines of grandstand seating without sacrificing the view. Below the porch was an interactive fan zone featuring amusement rides, a go-kart track, show cars and merchandise trailers. After the 2015 racing season, the Party Porch was torn down with the backstretch grandstands as part of the DAYTONA Rising project.

Events

Current

2.5-mile superspeedway

NASCAR Cup Series
Points-paying races: Daytona 500, Coke Zero Sugar 400
Qualifying races: Bluegreen Vacations Duel
NASCAR Xfinity Series
Beef. It's What's For Dinner. 300
Wawa 250
NASCAR Camping World Truck Series
NextEra Energy 250
ARCA Racing Series presented by Menards
Lucas Oil 200

Road course
WeatherTech SportsCar Championship (formerly Grand-American Rolex Sports Car Series)
Rolex 24 at Daytona
IMSA Continental Tire Sports Car Challenge
BMW Performance 200
Historic Sports Car Racing
Classic 24 Hours at Daytona
WKA Vega Road Racing Series driven by Mazda
Daytona Kart Week
ChampCar Endurance Series
The 14-Hours of Daytona Beach
WRL 
Concorso Daytona 14 Hours
MotoAmerica (from 2022)
Daytona 200

Other
Monster Energy AMA Supercross
Daytona Supercross by Honda
Ricky Carmichael Amateur Supercross
AMA Pro Flat Track Racing
Daytona Flat Track
WKA Mazda/Bridgestone Manufacturers Cup Series
Daytona Kart Week
WKA Speedway Dirt
Daytona Dirt World Championships
Daytona Beach Half Marathon
Welcome to Rockville

Former
AMA Daytona SportBike
Daytona 200
Brumos Porsche 250 (race ran by several series & sanctioning bodies)
Grand Prix motorcycle racing
United States motorcycle Grand Prix (1961–1965)
IROC
Superspeedway (1975–1978, 1985–1989, 1991–2006)
Road Course (1974, 2006)
ISCARS Dash Touring Series (formerly NASCAR Goody's Dash Series & IPOWER Dash)
IPOWER Dash 150 (1979–2004)
DaytonaUSA.com 150 (2001)
LATAM Challenge Series (2014)
NASCAR Convertible Division
Can-Am Duels (race now used for the NASCAR Cup Series) (1959)
USAC Championship Car
NASCAR Cup Series
O'Reilly Auto Parts 253
NASCAR Xfinity Series
Super Start Batteries 188
NASCAR Camping World Truck Series
BrakeBest Select 159
ARCA Menards Series
General Tire 100
Daytona 100 (1959)
NASCAR K&N Pro Series East
UNOH Battle at the Beach on backstretch oval (.375 miles)
NASCAR Whelen Modified Tour & Whelen Southern Modified Tour
UNOH Battle at the Beach on backstretch oval
Trans-Am Series 
Trans-Am Finale (1967–1968, 1984, 2013–2019)

Track records
As of January 2023, track records on the  tri-oval are as follows.

As of March 2023, the fastest official race lap records on the road course layouts are listed as:

Weather and climate

Daytona has a humid subtropical climate (Köppen Cfa), which enables year-round use of the facility. Light frosts are in theory possible, but unlikely, during the 24-hour event's nighttime under clear conditions, but general racing conditions are mild also during winter. With a dry season taking place during the winter months, the 500 generally has good odds of being run without rain delays. The summer event under the floodlights is more likely to undergo disturbances, due to the rainy tendencies of the hot, muggy, and humid summers. Due to the complete difference of seasons, the two NASCAR Cup races at Daytona see vastly different track conditions.

Gallery

See also
944 Cup
 List of Daytona International Speedway fatalities
 Daytona 500 Experience
 Motorsports Hall of Fame of America

Notes

References

External links
 
 
 
 Daytona Rising renovation site 
 Speedway Page  on NASCAR.com
 Jayski's Daytona International Speedway Page
 Trackpedia guide to driving this track
 Satellite picture by Google Maps
 VisitingFan.com: Reviews of Daytona International Speedway
 Deaths at Daytona at Fox Sports' website
 Auto-racing Fatalities list at USA Today website
 Daytona Deaths Chart at Sports Illustrated's website

NASCAR races at Daytona International Speedway
Sports venues completed in 1959
Motorsport venues in Florida
Motorsport in Daytona Beach, Florida
Sports venues in Volusia County, Florida
Tourist attractions in Daytona Beach, Florida
NASCAR tracks
ARCA Menards Series tracks
International Race of Champions tracks
Grand Prix motorcycle circuits
IMSA GT Championship circuits
Buildings and structures in Daytona Beach, Florida
1959 establishments in Florida